Dhindo is a meal prepared in Nepal. It is prepared by gradually adding flour to boiling water while stirring. It is a staple meal in various parts of Nepal and the Sikkim and Darjeeling regions of India. Though it is a staple food in Nepal, dhindo has previously been seen as an inferior food compared to rice, and was associated with low status. The inclusion of dhindo on urban restaurant menus has coincided with a rise in the food's prestige, possibly attributable to the changing perception of Nepal's indigenous crops, which are now recognized for their nutritional advantage.

Preparation and serving 

To prepare dhindo, water and flour are combined in a ratio of approximately three to one. While cooking, dhindo may have ghee, garlic, salt or sugar added to it, or the ghee may be served separately. The flour is added to the boiling water slowly, and stirred vigorously until the mixture is stiff. The process of making dhindo is called maskaaune (मस्काउने). 

Dhindo is traditionally prepared from ground buckwheat or millet, but corn meal is common as well. Theoretically, any flour can be used to make dhindo, as it is essentially a simple mixture of hot water and ground grain. Optionally, chopped mutton can be added to the dhindo, or small pieces or powder of soft chhurpi.

Dhindo is eaten by making a small ball with one's fingers, dipping it in a liquid (lentil soup, meat soup, milk or gundruk) and swallowing without chewing. It is often served with chutney.

See also 

 Nepalese cuisine
 Indian cuisine
 Ugali - a similar preparation from Africa
 Asida
 Dal bhat
 Polenta

References 

Nepalese cuisine
Bhutanese cuisine